"You Can't Hide Love" is a single by soul group Creative Source released in 1973 on Sussex Records. The song reached No. 48 on the Billboard Hot R&B Singles chart.

Overview
"You Can't Hide Love" was produced by Michael Stokes and composed by Skip Scarborough. The single's B-side was "Lovesville". Both songs came from Creative Source's 1973 self-titled debut studio album.

Charts

Earth, Wind & Fire version

Earth, Wind & Fire covered the song under the title of Can't Hide Love. This tune was released as a single in 1976 by Columbia Records and reached No. 11 on the US Billboard Hot Soul Songs chart and No. 39 on the US Billboard Hot 100 chart.

Overview
EWF's version was produced by Maurice White and Charles Stepney. The single's B-side was "Gratitude." Both songs came from the band's 1975 studio album Gratitude.

Critical reception
Record World said that it achieves "just the right mix of vocal harmonies." Within his review of Gratitude Alex Henderson of Allmusic called Can't Hide Love "haunting". 

Jason Elias of Allmusic wrote in his review of the song "While on the face this seems like a well-meaning plea, "Can't Hide Love" is filled with teasing, taunts, and a sense of bitterness that gives the song its emotional weight. Maurice White's insinuating lead was great enough, and near the end of the song Phillip Bailey does some great vocal runs. Bailey's riffs near the fade became the rite of passage for all fledging high tenor/falsettos."

Accolades
"Can't Hide Love" was Grammy nominated in the category of Best Instrumental Arrangement Accompanying Vocalist(s).

During 2008 Prince gave a live performance of "Can't Hide Love" on stage at the Hotel Gansevoort in Manhattan, New York.

Samples
EWF's rendition has also been sampled by artists such as Raheem DeVaughn on the song "Guess Who Loves You More" from his 2005 album The Love Experience, Drake on his 2009 tune Beautiful Life and Rick Ross on the song Capone Suite from the soundtrack of the 2018 feature film Superfly.  Esperanza Spalding quoted part of the song in her arrangement of "Jazz Ain't Nothin But Soul" that appears on her 2012 album Radio Music Society. In 2021, the song was sampled by  Lucky Daye on his song “You Want My Love” which features Earth, Wind and Fire.

Charts

Other cover versions
The artists who have covered "You Can't Hide Love" include Victor Wooten, Nancy Wilson, Saul Williams and Wayman Tisdale, as well as  Najee, Jaye P. Morgan, Dionne Warwick, John Tropea, Kenny Thomas, Bobby Tench with Hummingbird and Carmen McRae and D'Angelo.

References

1973 songs
1973 debut singles
1976 singles
Earth, Wind & Fire songs
Songs written by Skip Scarborough
Columbia Records singles
American rhythm and blues songs
1970s ballads